Munditia subquadrata, common name the squared munditia, is a species of small sea snail, a marine gastropod mollusk, in the family Liotiidae.

Description
The size of the shell varies between 3.5 mm and 6.5 mm. The Tasmanian specimen attains a diameter of 9 mm. The small, white, thickly shell has a discoid shape. It is flattened above. It is very finely undulately striate all over. The four whorls are angular above, coronate and radiately ribbed, rounded below, and furnished with two rounded obsolete granular keels. The umbilicus is very ample, with an elegantly dentate margin. The orbicular aperture is toothed.

Distribution
This marine species is endemic to Australia. It occurs off South Australia, Tasmania, Victoria and Western Australia.

References

 Tenison-Woods, J.E. 1879. On some Tertiary fossils from Muddy Creek, Western Victoria. Proceedings of the Linnean Society of New South Wales 3: 222-240
 Tate, R. 1899. A revision of the Australian Cyclostrematidae and Liotiidae. Transactions of the Royal Society of South Australia 23(2): 213-229
 Cotton, B.C. 1959. South Australian Mollusca. Archaeogastropoda. Handbook of the Flora and Fauna of South Australia. Adelaide : South Australian Government Printer 449 pp 
 Jenkins, B.W. 1984. Southern Australian Liotiidae. Australian Shell News 47: 3-5
 Wilson, B. 1993. Australian Marine Shells. Prosobranch Gastropods. Kallaroo, Western Australia : Odyssey Publishing Vol. 1 408 pp.

External links
 To World Register of Marine Species
 

subquadrata
Gastropods described in 1878